Lucius Junius (C. f. C. n.) Pullus (died 249 or 248 BC) was a Roman general and the  consul of Rome in 249 BC. together with Publius Claudius Pulcher during the First Punic War.

After the disastrous defeat of Publius Claudius Pulcher's fleet at the First Battle of Drepana, where his colleagues fleet was almost completely destroyed by the Carthaginian navy, Pulcher was recalled to Rome and fined for his incompetence. Pullus' own fleet was subsequently also destroyed by a storm and harassment from Carthaginian vessels. According to the chronicles, his dismay at losing the fleet led Lucius Junius Pullus to take his own life rather than returning to Rome in shame as his colleague had done.

See also 

 First Punic War
 Siege of Lilybaeum (250 BC)

References 
 The information on this page was translated from its Spanish equivalent.

Junius Pullus, Lucius
3rd-century BC Roman consuls
Roman commanders of the First Punic War
Ancient Roman generals
Pullus, Lucius
Year of birth unknown